A by-election was held in the Cook Islands electorate of Tengatangi-Areora-Ngatiarua on 14 November 2019. The by-election was triggered by the resignation of MP Te-Hani Brown following an earlier by-election. The by-election was won by Te-Hani Brown.

Background
The March 2019 Tengatangi-Areora-Ngatiarua by-election was won by Te Hani Brown. Following the by-election, Democratic party candidate Nandi Glassie filed a petition against her victory, alleging that she had effectively bribed voters by covering the charge of a private aircraft to carry voters to vote on Atiu. Brown maintained that this did not constitute an offence. Brown resigned in April 2019 during the process of the petition through the courts and although Glassie was allowed to challenge the election result, this was reversed on appeal. Brown's seat was declared vacant in September 2019, triggering the by-election.

Glassie was too ill to contest the by-election, and the Democratic party instead selected businesswoman June Baudinet.

Results

References

2019 Tengatangi
Tengatangi-Areora-Ngatiarua
2019 in the Cook Islands
Atiu